Tyrus is a genus of ant-loving beetles in the family Staphylinidae. There are about five described species in Tyrus.

Species
These five species belong to the genus Tyrus:
 Tyrus corticinus (Casey, 1887) i c b
 Tyrus humeralis (Aubé, 1844) i c g
 Tyrus mucronatus (Panzer, 1803) g
 Tyrus peyroni Saulcy, 1874 g
 Tyrus semiruber Casey, 1897 i c g b
Data sources: i = ITIS, c = Catalogue of Life, g = GBIF, b = Bugguide.net

References

Further reading

 
 

Pselaphitae
Articles created by Qbugbot